Catoxantha purpurea is a species of jewel beetles belonging to the family Buprestidae, subfamily Chrysochroinae.

Distribution
This beetle has an Indomalayan distribution (Philippines; Luzon Island).

Description
This beautiful jewel beetle has metallic reddish purple elytra with thick and prominent black costae and one yellow transverse bands. Legs and antennae are black. Abdominal sternum is yellow.

References

External links
 Flickr
 Buprestidae of Indo-Malaysia, Indochina and Philippines

Buprestidae
Beetles described in 1843